Duntrune Castle is located on the north side of Loch Crinan and across from the village of Crinan in Argyll, Scotland. It is thought to be the oldest continuously occupied castle on mainland Scotland. The castle is a category B listed building.

History
It was originally built by the MacDougall clan in the 13th century, along with several other castles in the area, including the MacDougall stronghold of Dunollie Castle near Oban. Duntrune Castle was eventually taken by the Clan Campbell. In the 17th century the castle was besieged by the rival MacDonalds, under Alasdair Mac Colla. The Campbells sold Duntrune in 1792, to the Malcolms of Poltalloch. The castle is now owned by Robin Neill Malcolm, current clan chief of the Clan Malcolm.

The curtain wall of the castle dates from the 13th century, although the tower house which forms the main part of the castle is of the 17th century. The castle was renovated in 1954.

Popular culture
The gateposts of Skyfall lodge, James Bond's childhood home in the film of the same name, were modelled after those at Duntrune.

A photograph of Duntrune Castle is part of the original album inner sleeve art of the Blue Öyster Cult album Imaginos.

See also
Duntroon, Australian Capital Territory, a location named after the castle
Robert Campbell (1769–1846), descended from the Campbells of Duntroon

References

External links
Gazetteer for Scotland

Castles in Argyll and Bute
Category B listed buildings in Argyll and Bute
Listed castles in Scotland
Reportedly haunted locations in Scotland
Inventory of Gardens and Designed Landscapes
Clan MacDougall